See also the 212 Export sports racer
The Ferrari 212 Inter replaced Ferrari's successful 166 and 195 Inter grand tourers in 1951.  Unveiled at the Brussels Motor Show that year, the 212 was an evolution of the 166 — a sports car for the road that could also win international races. In 1951, two 212 Inters, both Vignale coupés, driven by Taruffi/Chinetti and Ascari/Villoresi, scored 1–2 victory at Carrera Panamericana in Mexico.

The chassis was similar to the 125 with a suspension featuring double wishbones in front and live axle in back.  Coachbuilders included Carrozzeria Touring, Ghia, Ghia-Aigle, Vignale, Stabilimenti Farina, and now Pinin Farina.  The latter was an important move for the company, as Farina was already well-known and adding his styling skills would be a tremendous boost for Maranello.  However, Pinin Farina was as prideful as Enzo Ferrari, and neither would go to the other to request business up to this point.  A mutual meeting halfway between Maranello and Turin was the negotiated solution. First Ferrari to be bodied by Pinin Farina was 212 Inter Cabriolet, chassis no. 0177E.

The Inter's  wheelbase was 4" longer than the  Export's. The cars shared a larger, bored-out (68 mm) 2.6 L (2563 cc/156 in³) version of Ferrari's Colombo V12 engine. Improved cylinder heads raised power  in 1952.

The British magazine Autocar got hold of what they described as the first production model Ferrari 212 in 1950, which outperformed any car that they had previously tested. The test appears also to have been the Autocar team's first encounter with a five speed gear box.

212/225 Inter
A single 212 Inter, chassis no. 0223EU, was fitted with the available 225 S or 2.7 L Colombo V12 engine, combined with a long wheelbase Europa type chassis, creating a unique model that would be properly referred to as a 225 Inter or 225 Europa. This 1952 one-off model was given a Giovanni Michelotti-penned coupé body built by Vignale.

Another 212 Inter, chassis number 0253EU, also received the 2.7 liter three-carburetor V12, and was bodied as the last Barchetta by Carrozzeria Touring in their Superleggera construction method. It was acquired by Ford Motor Company for Henry Ford II for study in the research leading to the development of Ford's competitor to the Corvette, the Thunderbird. The car is currently in the collection of the Petersen Automotive Museum in Los Angeles, CA.

References

Bibliography
 

212
Sports cars
24 Hours of Le Mans race cars
Carrera Panamericana
Cars introduced in 1951